Sonapur is a village near Jiribam in  Jiribam district of Manipur, India.

Notable people
Ashab Uddin, member of the Manipur Legislative Assembly

References

Villages in Jiribam district